is a 1973 Japanese ero guro jidaigeki film directed by Teruo Ishii. and distributed by Toei. The film was adapted from the manga Bōhachi bushidō.

Synopsis
Shinō Ashita is an assassin. One day he is surrounded by enemies during a battle and tries to commit suicide but he is rescued by a clan known as the Bōhachi.

Cast

 Tetsurō Tamba : Shinō Ashita
 Gorō Ibuki : Kesazō
 Yuriko Hishimi : Omon
 Tatsuo Endō : Shirobei Daimon
 Shōki Fukae : Sanjirō Kada
 Takuzo Kawatani : Kurosukimono
 Rena Ichinose : Otoki
 Ruriko Ikeshima : Okō
 Kimiji Harada : Kinroku
 Kyōichi Satō : Kanroku
 Shirō Kuno : Kanji
 Ryōhei Uchida : Kurosuki no Kokaku

References

External links 

1973 films
1970s exploitation films
Films directed by Teruo Ishii
Live-action films based on manga
Toei Pinky Violence
Toei Company films
1970s pornographic films
Films set in the Edo period
Jidaigeki films
Samurai films
1970s Japanese films